Adelasia (variant forms include Adelaide, Azalaïs, and Alasia) may refer to:
 Adelaide del Vasto (–1118), countess of Sicily and Queen of Jerusalem, wife of Roger I of Sicily
 Azalaïs of Montferrat (died 1232), regent of the Marquisate of Saluzzo
 Adelasia of Torres (1207–1259), Giudice of Logudoro and of Gallura
 The Adelasia who, according to legend, was daughter of Otto I the Great, eloped with Aleramo, and founded Alassio

Italian feminine given names